The 1988–89 Hong Kong First Division League season was the 78th since its establishment.

League table

References
1988–89 Hong Kong First Division table (RSSSF)

Hong
Hong Kong First Division League seasons
1988–89 in Hong Kong football